Parliament railway station is an underground railway station in Melbourne, Australia. It is one of three underground stations on the City Loop, which serves the Melbourne CBD. In 2017/2018 it was the fourth-busiest station on Melbourne's metropolitan network, with 10.19 million passenger movements.

The station serves Melbourne's government district, and is underneath Parliament House and the intersection of Bourke and Spring Streets, at the eastern end of the CBD. It is currently the world's southernmost underground railway station, but will be superseded by Anzac station when the Metro Tunnel opens in 2025.

History
The station platforms were constructed using tunnelling methods. A pilot tunnel was made, enabling the walls to be constructed ahead of the main excavation. Each platform is an individual tunnel, and is linked to the other platforms at the same level by a number of cross tunnels. That choice of design left the remaining pillar of rock between the tunnels too weak to support the required loads, so it was replaced with concrete.

The booking hall to the south was constructed "upside down", with the support columns being dug with augers from ground level, then filled with concrete. The roof was then constructed over the piles from ground level, during a series of staged road closures. Once that was completed, the excavation of the booking hall was carried out underneath, while road traffic continued overhead. During construction, the Parliament House fence had to be removed, stored then re-erected.

The station opened on 22 January 1983. At the time of opening, the station had the longest escalators in the southern hemisphere, but it has since been surpassed by Airport Central railway station in Perth.

Facilities
Parliament station has three underground levels: a concourse level and four platforms on the two levels underneath. Each platform serves a separate group of rail lines that leave the Loop and radiate out into the city's suburbs.

Parliament has two separate concourses. They each have a ticket office, toilets and ticket-operated gates.

The northern concourse is located at the junction of Spring, Lonsdale and Nicholson Streets, and has three escalators and a lift going down to the platforms, as well has a lift and steps leading to street level.
The southern concourse is near the Spring and Collins Street intersection, and has four escalators descending to the platforms. There are three exits to ground level via steps: one to MacArthur Street, the other two exits on Spring Street, facing Bourke Street and near Collins Street.

Platforms and services
Platform 1 - Clifton Group
 all stations and limited express services to Mernda
 all stations and limited express services to Hurstbridge

Platform 2 - Caulfield Group
 express services to Pakenham via Flinders Street
 express services to Cranbourne via Flinders Street           

Platform 3 - Northern Group 
 all stations services to Craigieburn
 all stations services to Upfield
 all stations and limited express services to Sunbury 
Customers for Werribee or Williamstown services change at Flinders Street, Southern Cross or North Melbourne

Platform 4 - Burnley Group
 all stations and limited express services to Lilydale
 all stations and limited express services to Belgrave
 all stations and limited express services to Glen Waverley
 weekday shoulder peak all stations and limited express services to Alamein

Transport links
Yarra Trams operates seven services via Parliament station:

Spring Street

: City Circle

Bourke Street

: Bundoora RMIT - Waterfront City (Docklands)
: East Brunswick - St Kilda Beach

Collins Street
: West Preston - Victoria Harbour (Docklands)
: Victoria Gardens - St Kilda
: North Balwyn - Victoria Harbour (Docklands)
: Box Hill - Port Melbourne

References

External links

Melway map at street-directory.com.au

Premium Melbourne railway stations
Railway stations in Australia opened in 1983
Railway stations in the City of Melbourne (LGA)
Railway stations located underground in Melbourne